Prairie is an unincorporated community in Wilcox County, Alabama.  Prairie has one site listed on the National Register of Historic Places, the Prairie Mission school.

References

Unincorporated communities in Alabama
Unincorporated communities in Wilcox County, Alabama